Dezső Molnár (born 12 December 1939) is a Hungarian football forward who played for Hungary in the 1966 FIFA World Cup. He also played for Vasas SC.

References

External links
 FIFA profile

1939 births
Hungarian footballers
Hungary international footballers
Association football forwards
Vasas SC players
1966 FIFA World Cup players
Living people
Sportspeople from Vas County